The Richard J. Dorer Memorial Hardwood State Forest is a  reserve of current and former forest in Minnesota's Driftless Area. Only  of the land is state owned, with the remainder owned by private individuals and community groups, governed by easements. Non-contiguous units are spread over seven counties ( Dakota, Fillmore, Goodhue, Olmsted, Houston, Wabasha, and Winona Counties), generally in areas just west of the Mississippi River, but extending much further west into the valleys of the Root and Zumbro Rivers. 

A wide variety of recreational activities are offered: camping, fishing, horseback riding trails (including horse picket lines and corrals); an extensive network of hiking and nature trails (including a wheelchair-accessible trail), and off-highway vehicle trails.

It is named in honor of a former Commissioner of Conservation.

See also
List of Minnesota state forests
Great River Bluffs State Park
John A. Latsch State Park
Beaver Creek Valley State Park
Carley State Park
Frontenac State Park
Whitewater State Park

External links
Richard J. Dorer Memorial Hardwood State Forest - Minnesota Department of Natural Resources (DNR)

Sources
 "Richard J. Dorer Memorial Hardwood", Minnesota Department of Natural Resources, Retrieved July 15, 2007
"The Richard J. Dorer Memorial Hardwood State Forest" Retrieved July 15, 2007

Minnesota state forests
Driftless Area
Protected areas on the Mississippi River
Protected areas of Winona County, Minnesota
Protected areas of Houston County, Minnesota
Protected areas established in 1961
Protected areas of Dakota County, Minnesota
Protected areas of Fillmore County, Minnesota
Protected areas of Goodhue County, Minnesota
Protected areas of Olmsted County, Minnesota
Protected areas of Wabasha County, Minnesota